The National Numeracy Strategy arose out of the National Numeracy Project in 1996, led by a Numeracy Task Force in England. The strategy included an outline of expected teaching in mathematics for all pupils from Reception to Year 6.

In 2003, the strategy, including the framework for teaching, was absorbed into the broader Primary National Strategy. The framework for teaching was updated in 2006.

See also
National Curriculum (England, Wales and Northern Ireland)
Key Stage
Chunking (division)
Grid method multiplication
Number bond

Further reading

 Department for Education and Employment (January 1998), Numeracy matters: the preliminary report of the Numeracy Task Force, London: DfEE
 Department for Education and Employment (1998), The implementation of the National Numeracy Strategy: The final report of the Numeracy Task Force, London: DfEE
 Department for Education and Employment (1999), The National Numeracy Strategy: framework for teaching mathematics from reception to Year 6, London: DfEE.  -- browse (via Dudley Council); browse (via CountOn.org); download (via Norfolk County Council).
 QCA (1999), Standards in mathematics: exemplification of key learning objectives from reception to year 6
 Gary Eason, Back to school for parents, BBC News, 13 February 2000
 Rob Eastaway, Why parents can't do maths today, BBC News, 10 September 2010
 Mary Ruddle, How maths teaching has changed – the new order of learning, mad4maths website, 2007
 Ian Thompson (2000), Is the National Numeracy Strategy evidence based?, Mathematics Teaching, 171, 23–27
 Dylan V. Jones (2002), National numeracy initiatives in England and Wales: a comparative study of policy, The Curriculum Journal, 13 (1), 5–23.
 Chris Kyriacou and Maria Goulding (2004), A systematic review of the impact of the Daily Mathematics Lesson in enhancing pupil confidence and competence in early mathematics, Evidence for Policy and Practice Information and Co-ordinating Centre (EPPI), Institute of Education, London.

External links
Government Primary Frameworks website (Archived, via the National Archives)

Education in England
Mathematics education in the United Kingdom